The VinFast VF 9 is a full-size crossover SUV manufactured and marketed by VinFast of Vingroup from 2021.

Overview
The full-size VF 9 model made its debut together with the smaller VF6 and VF 8 models as the largest of the range of electric crossovers unveiled in January 2021, being the first vehicles of this type by the Vietnamese manufacturer.

The VF 9 is characterized by a massive silhouette with a length of over 5.1 metres, gaining an avant-garde stylized silhouette with a two-module window line, as well as narrow strips of headlamps and rear lamps consisting of Matrix LED lighting. Characterized by AWD, the vehicle will accommodate a maximum of 7 people on three rows of seats.

The passenger cabin has been kept in a minimalist design, gaining a massive, 15.4-inch touch screen displaying not only the multimedia system indications but also the onboard computer and speedometer information due to its integration with the instrument cluster.

Like the smaller VF 8, the VF 9 will go on sale in Vietnam in September 2021, with the first units delivered in February 2022. The vehicle will also be part of the global expansion of VinFast, in mid-2022 it will go on sale, among others, in Australia, Europe and North America.

The VF 9 is offered as a dual motor variant consisting of a battery with a capacity of 106 kWh, developing .

References 

Cars introduced in 2021
Crossover sport utility vehicles
Full-size sport utility vehicles
Production electric cars
VF e36
Battery electric vehicles
All-wheel-drive vehicles